Russell Jones may refer to:
Russell Jones (actor) (born 1978), Welsh actor and musician
Ol' Dirty Bastard (Russell Jones, 1968–2004), rapper
Russell L. Jones, Welsh botanist
Russell Jones (cricketer) (born 1980), cricketer
Russ Jones (born 1942), Canadian writer
Russell Jones (ice hockey) (1926–2012), Australian ice hockey player
Russell Jones (orientalist) (1926 – 2019), British Orientalist
Russell Celyn Jones (born 1952), British writer and academic
Russell Jones (politician) (born 1948), member of the Arizona House of Representatives